This is a list of ski areas and resorts in Slovenia.

Map 

 large ski resorts
 medium ski resorts
 small ski resorts

By size

Large 
Between 12 and 42 kilometers of slopes.

Medium 
Between 3 and 8 kilometers of slopes.

Small 
Less than 3 kilometers of slopes.

1skilift/chair-lift/cable car; if only one number: total

Not working 

Abandoned or ex ski resorts, although most lifts still stand. Mostly financial reasons or ski lifts are out of date and modern standards or demolished.

See also
Julian Alps
Kamnik–Savinja Alps
Pohorje

Footnotes

References 

 
Slovenia